served as the Chairman of the National Executive Council, and as a member of the National Board of Governors of the Boy Scouts of Nippon.

Background
In 1992, Hirose was awarded the 218th Bronze Wolf, the only distinction of the World Organization of the Scout Movement, awarded by the World Scout Committee for exceptional services to world Scouting. In 1997 he also received the highest distinction of the Scout Association of Japan, the Golden Pheasant Award.

References

External links

https://web.archive.org/web/20131014183020/http://www5.airnet.ne.jp/bsy87/Y87eng/eNews/08_BRZ/eY87_2008_brz_01a.html
https://web.archive.org/web/20090327024400/http://www.scout.org/en/content/download/11624/94866/file/Triennial_Report_EN_5.pdf
Full list of Japanese Bronze Wolf recipients
http://www.scout-ib.net/06MUSEUM/assets/pa-yan.html

Recipients of the Bronze Wolf Award
Year of birth missing
Year of death missing
Scouting in Japan